Cabinet of Sergei Witte – composition of the Council of Ministers of the Russian Empire, under the leadership of Sergei Witte, worked from November 6, 1905 to May 5, 1906.

Cabinet of Sergei Witte was the first Cabinet in Russian history. Despite his short work during this period has been done so many important affairs of state, created by the State Duma.

The first step of Sergei Witte as Prime Minister was the invitation to his dacha on Stone island editors of all the major St. Petersburg Newspapers, to the media to announce the creation of a coalition Cabinet. However, the venture he did not. The editors said Mr. Witte that "don't trust the government" and demanded the withdrawal of troops from Petersburg.

As a result, the Witt has not received love and recognition from the liberal part of Russian society, nor the circle of the king. After five months on the post of the Chairman of the Council of Ministers Witte asked for king's resignation. Nicholas II easily took her in.

Ministers

References

Witte
1905 establishments in the Russian Empire
1906 in the Russian Empire
Cabinets established in 1905